Aliaksandar Hlavatski (born 2 May 1970 in Salihorsk) is a former Belarusian athlete who specialized in both long jump and triple jump.

His personal best jumps in the two events are 8.33 and 17.53 metres respectively.

Achievements

1No mark in the final

External links

1970 births
Living people
Belarusian male long jumpers
Belarusian male triple jumpers
Athletes (track and field) at the 1996 Summer Olympics
Athletes (track and field) at the 2004 Summer Olympics
Olympic athletes of Belarus
People from Salihorsk
Sportspeople from Minsk Region